CENTRESTAGE is an international fashion trade show organised annually by the Hong Kong Trade Development Council (HKTDC).

History
The Hong Kong Trade Development Council (HKTDC) first launched CENTRESTAGE in 2016 as a new promotion and launch platform for international  Asian fashion brands and designs.

The fourth edition of the fashion trade show was staged from 4 to 7 September 2019 at the Hong Kong Convention and Exhibition Centre. The 2019 show attracted some 240 fashion brands from 23 countries and regions, and attracted close to 7,000 buyers from 74 countries and regions. Many other fashion events were held during the trade show, including runway shows, designer sharing sessions, industry seminars and networking events.

Purpose
CENTRESTAGE is organised to promote fashion designers' collection and brands from around the world.

See also
 Hong Kong Trade Development Council
 Hong Kong Convention and Exhibition Centre

References

Fashion events in China
Trade fairs in Hong Kong